Teke or Tekke can refer to:

People
 Teke (tribe), a tribe of southern Turkmenistan
 Teke people or Bateke, a Central African ethnic group
 Fatih Tekke (born 1977), Turkish footballer
 Kent Tekulve (born 1947), American baseball player

Places

 Tekke of Frashër, a Bektashi shrine and Cultural Monument of Albania in Gjirokastër County 
 Tekke of Martanesh, a Cultural Monument of Albania in Dibër County
 Tekke of Melan, a khanqah in Libohovë, Albania
 Teke (lake), Kazakhstan
 Teke, Lesotho
 Tekke, Kazan, Ankara Province, Turkey
 Tekke, Sarayköy, Denizli Province, Turkey
 Teke Peninsula, in Antalya Province, Turkey
 Beylik of Teke, a frontier principality established by Oghuz Turkish clans
 Mount Teke, the highest peak in İskilip, Turkey
 Teaca, a commune in Bistriţa-Năsăud County, Romania
 Tekke, a neighborhood of Görmeli, Turkey
 Khanqah (or Tekke), a building for gatherings of a Sufi brotherhood

Religion
 Tekke or Khanqah, a building designed specifically for gatherings of a Sufi brotherhood
 Tekke or Zawiya, a gathering place of a Sufi order, or the shrine of a saint
 Tekyeh, a place where Shiites gather for mourning of Muharram

Other uses
 Teke languages, a series of Bantu languages spoken by the Teke people
 Teke Teke, a Japanese urban legend
 Akhal-Teke, a horse breed associated with the tribe
 Tau Kappa Epsilon fraternity, one of its members, or its quarterly publication THE TEKE
 Telekinesis, as in George R.R. Martin's novella Nightflyers

See also
Teak, a tropical hardwood tree species
Tekes (disambiguation)
Tiki (disambiguation)

Language and nationality disambiguation pages